Barry R. Bloom is Harvard University Distinguished Service Professor and Joan L. and Julius H. Jacobson Professor of Public Health in the Department of Immunology and Infectious Diseases and Department of Global Health and Population in the Harvard T.H. Chan School of Public Health in Boston, where he served as dean of the faculty from 1998 through December 31, 2008.

As dean, he served as secretary treasurer for the Association of Schools of Public Health. Prior to that he served as chairman of the Department of Microbiology and Immunology at the Albert Einstein College of Medicine from 1978 to 1990, the year in which he became an investigator of the Howard Hughes Medical Institute, where he also served on the national advisory board. In 1978, he was a consultant to the White House on international health policy.

Education
 A.B. (biology), Amherst College, 1958
 Ph.D. (immunology), Rockefeller University, 1963
 D.Sc. (Honorary), Amherst College

Early life 
Bloom notes that the influence of the numerous physicians in his family led him to believe that he would eventually become a physician practicing clinical medical.

Career
Bloom has been a leading scientist in various areas of infectious diseases, vaccines, and global health, and is a former consultant to the White House.  Most of his research has been as the principal investigator of a laboratory researching the immune response to tuberculosis, a disease that claims more than 1.5 million lives each year.

For more than 40 years, he has been extensively involved with the World Health Organization. He is currently chair of their Technical and Research Advisory Committee to the Global Programme on Malaria.  He has also been a member of their Advisory Committee on Health Research, and chaired their Committees on Leprosy Research and Tuberculosis Research and the Scientific and Technical Advisory Committee of the United Nations Development Programme/World Bank/World Health Organization Special Programme for Research and Training in Tropical Diseases. Bloom serves on the editorial board of the Bulletin of the World Health Organization.

Bloom currently serves on the Ellison Medical Foundation scientific advisory board and the Wellcome Trust Pathogens, Immunology and Population Health Strategy Committee. He is on the scientific advisory board of the Earth Institute at Columbia University and the advisory council of the Paul G. Rogers Society for Global Health Research.

His past service includes membership on the national advisory council of the National Institute of Allergy and Infectious Diseases, the scientific advisory board of the National Center for Infectious Diseases of the Centers for Disease Control and Prevention, and the national advisory board of the Fogarty International Center at the National Institutes of Health, as well as the governing board of the Institute of Medicine.

Bloom was the founding chair of the board of trustees for the International Vaccine Institute in South Korea, which is devoted to promoting vaccine development for children in the developing world. He has chaired the Vaccine Advisory Committee of the Joint United Nations Programme on HIV/AIDS, better known as UNAIDS, where he played a critical role in the debate surrounding the ethics of AIDS vaccine trials. He was also a member of the US AIDS Research Committee. He serves on the board of the US-China Health Summit.

Bloom has offered expert analysis on the Covid-19 pandemic and in the fall of 2020 was asked to serve on the Massachusetts state advisory committee on coronavirus vaccines.

Current research
Dr. Bloom researches the mechanisms of immune protection against tuberculosis, as an investigator in a Bill and Melinda Gates Grand Challenge grant with Professor David Edwards the Harvard John A. Paulson School of Engineering and Applied Sciences, where they study nanoparticle technology to deliver needle-free spray-drying aerosol vaccines against experimental tuberculosis. This vitamin D-dependent antimicrobial killing mechanism is effective against Mycobacterium tuberculosis and is found in human macrophages, and is unrelated to oxygen or nitrogen radicals. This may explain the greater susceptibility of people of African and Asian descent to tuberculosis.

Professional associations
Current service
 National Advisory Board, Fogarty International Center, National Institutes of Health
 Governing Board, Institute of Medicine
 National Advisory Council, National Institute of Allergy and Infectious Diseases
 Scientific Advisory Board, National Center for Infectious Diseases, Centers for Disease Control and Prevention
 National Advisory Board, Howard Hughes Medical Institute
 Consultant on international health policy, The White House, 1978
 Past Secretary Treasurer, Association of Schools of Public Health (ASPH) (while dean of the faculty at HSPH) 
 Scientific Advisory Board, Ellison Medical Foundation
 Pathogens, Immunology and Population Health Strategy Committee, Wellcome Trust
 Scientific Advisory Board, Earth Institute Center for Environmental Sustainability, Columbia University
 Advisory Council, Paul G. Rogers Society for Global Health Research
 Board, US-China Health Summit.

Past service
 Past President, American Association of Immunologists
 Past President, Federation of American Societies for Experimental Biology
 National Advisory Council, National Institute of Allergy and Infectious Diseases
 Scientific Advisory Board, National Center for Infectious Diseases, Centers for Disease Control and Prevention
 National Advisory Board, Fogarty International Center, National Institutes of Health
 Governing Board, Institute of Medicine

Awards
 Past President, American Association of Immunologists
 Past President, Federation of American Societies for Experimental Biology
 Bristol-Myers Squibb Award for Distinguished Research in Infectious Diseases (first awardee)
 Novartis Award for Clinical Immunology, 1998 (shared)
 Robert Koch Medal for lifetime research in infectious diseases, 1999
 Member, National Academy of Sciences
 Member, Institutes of Medicine
 Member, American Association for the Advancement of Science
 Member, American Philosophical Society

Publications
 A relatively complete list of major publications is found at the Dr. Bloom's Harvard Catalyst researcher profile.
 Bloom, BR, and Bennett B. “Mechanism of a reaction in vitro associated with delayed type hypersensitivity.” Science 153, no. 3731.

External references
 Harvard Faculty profile for Barry R. Bloom
 Harvard Faculty research profile for Barry R. Bloom
 Harvard researcher profile for Barry R. Bloom – extensive bibliography (290 publications)
 Powell, A. Gates Foundation awards two Harvard investigators $26 million: Grants aim to advance global health.  Harvard Gazette, August 25, 2005.

References

Living people
Malariologists
Harvard School of Public Health faculty
HIV/AIDS researchers
American immunologists
Amherst College alumni
Rockefeller University alumni
Central High School (Philadelphia) alumni
Howard Hughes Medical Investigators
Year of birth missing (living people)
Fellows of the American Academy of Microbiology
Members of the National Academy of Medicine